Anton Brosenbauer (born 11 April 1909, date of death unknown) was an Austrian international footballer.

References

1909 births
Year of death missing
Association football forwards
Austrian footballers
Austria international footballers
First Vienna FC players